Liquid hydrogen (H2(l)) is the liquid state of the element hydrogen. Hydrogen is found naturally in the molecular H2 form.

A common method of obtaining liquid hydrogen involves a compressor resembling a jet engine in both appearance and principle. Liquid hydrogen is typically used as a concentrated form of hydrogen storage. Storing it as liquid takes less space than storing it as a gas at normal temperature and pressure. However, the liquid density is very low compared to other common fuels. Once liquefied, it can be maintained as a liquid in thermally insulated containers.

There are two spin isomers of hydrogen; liquid hydrogen consists of 99.79% parahydrogen and 0.21% orthohydrogen.

History

In 1885, Zygmunt Florenty Wróblewski published hydrogen's critical temperature as 33K; critical pressure, 13.3 atmospheres; and boiling point, 23K.

Hydrogen was liquefied by James Dewar in 1898 by using regenerative cooling and his invention, the vacuum flask. The first synthesis of the stable isomer form of liquid hydrogen, parahydrogen, was achieved by Paul Harteck and Karl Friedrich Bonhoeffer in 1929.

Spin isomers of hydrogen

The two nuclei in a dihydrogen molecule can have two different spin states.
Parahydrogen, in which the two nuclear spins are antiparallel, is more stable than orthohydrogen, in which the two are parallel. At room temperature, gaseous hydrogen is mostly in the ortho isomeric form due to thermal energy, but an ortho-enriched mixture is only metastable when liquified at low temperature. It slowly undergoes an exothermic reaction to become the para isomer, with enough energy released as heat to cause some of the liquid to boil. To prevent loss of the liquid during long-term storage, it is therefore intentionally converted to the para isomer as part of the production process, typically using a catalyst such as iron(III) oxide, activated carbon, platinized asbestos, rare earth metals, uranium compounds, chromium(III) oxide, or some nickel compounds.

Uses
Liquid hydrogen is a common liquid rocket fuel for rocketry applications — both NASA and the United States Air Force operate a large number of liquid hydrogen tanks with an individual capacity up to 3.8 million liters (1 million U.S. gallons). In most rocket engines fueled by liquid hydrogen, it first cools the nozzle and other parts before being mixed with the oxidizer — usually liquid oxygen (LOX) — and burned to produce water with traces of ozone and hydrogen peroxide. Practical H2–O2 rocket engines run fuel-rich so that the exhaust contains some unburned hydrogen. This reduces combustion chamber and nozzle erosion. It also reduces the molecular weight of the exhaust, which can actually increase specific impulse, despite the incomplete combustion.

Liquid hydrogen can be used as the fuel for an internal combustion engine or fuel cell. Various submarines (Type 212 submarine, Type 214 submarine) and concept hydrogen vehicles have been built using this form of hydrogen (see DeepC, BMW H2R). Due to its similarity, builders can sometimes modify and share equipment with systems designed for liquefied natural gas (LNG). Liquid hydrogen is being investigated as a zero carbon fuel for aircraft. However, because of the lower volumetric energy, the hydrogen volumes needed for combustion are large. Unless direct injection is used, a severe gas-displacement effect also hampers maximum breathing and increases pumping losses.

Liquid hydrogen is also used to cool neutrons to be used in neutron scattering. Since neutrons and hydrogen nuclei have similar masses, kinetic energy exchange per interaction is maximum (elastic collision). Finally, superheated liquid hydrogen was used in many bubble chamber experiments.

The first thermonuclear bomb, Ivy Mike, used liquid deuterium (hydrogen-2), for nuclear fusion.

Properties
The product of hydrogen combustion in a pure oxygen environment is solely water vapor. However, the high combustion temperatures and present atmospheric nitrogen can result in the breaking of N≡N bonds, forming toxic NOx if no exhaust scrubbing is done. Since water is often considered harmless to the environment, an engine burning it can be considered "zero emissions". In aviation, however, water vapor emitted in the atmosphere contributes to global warming (to a lesser extent than CO2). Liquid hydrogen also has a much higher specific energy than gasoline, natural gas, or diesel.

The density of liquid hydrogen is only 70.85 g/L (at 20 K), a relative density of just 0.07. Although the specific energy is more than twice that of other fuels, this gives it a remarkably low volumetric energy density, many fold lower.

Liquid hydrogen requires cryogenic storage technology such as special thermally insulated containers and requires special handling common to all cryogenic fuels. This is similar to, but more severe than liquid oxygen.  Even with thermally insulated containers it is difficult to keep such a low temperature, and the hydrogen will gradually leak away (typically at a rate of 1% per day). It also shares many of the same safety issues as other forms of hydrogen, as well as being cold enough to liquefy, or even solidify atmospheric oxygen, which can be an explosion hazard.

The triple point of hydrogen is at 13.81 K 7.042 kPa.

Safety
Due to its cold temperatures, liquid hydrogen is a hazard for cold burns. Elemental hydrogen as a liquid is biologically inert and its only human health hazard as a vapor is displacement of oxygen, resulting in asphyxiation. Because of its flammability, liquid hydrogen should be kept away from heat or flame unless ignition is intended.

See also

Industrial gas
Liquefaction of gases
Hydrogen safety
Compressed hydrogen
Cryo-adsorption
Expansion ratio
Gasoline gallon equivalent
Slush hydrogen
Solid hydrogen
Metallic hydrogen
Hydrogen infrastructure
Hydrogen-powered aircraft
Liquid hydrogen tank car
Liquid hydrogen tanktainer

References

Hydrogen physics
Hydrogen technologies
Hydrogen storage
Liquid fuels
Rocket fuels
Coolants
Cryogenics
Hydrogen
Industrial gases
1898 in science